"Hasta Que Salga el Sol" (English: "Until Sunrise") is a Latin tropical pop song written by Don Omar and is the second single from the compilation album Don Omar Presents MTO²: New Generation (2012). The song was released digitally on June 4, 2012. It was the official theme song of Miss Universe 2012, which was held in December 2012 and broadcast on NBC, Telemundo and streamed on the Xbox Live platform. "Hasta Que Salga el Sol" won the Latin Grammy Award for Best Urban Song and was nominated for Urban Song of the Year at the Premio Lo Nuestro 2013.

Composition
"Hasta Que Salga el Sol" is a Latin song with Brazilian influences, running at 127 beats per minute.

Charts

Weekly charts

Year-end charts

Other

The song is also used as a part of the Discovery Island Carnivale at Disney's Animal Kingdom in Walt Disney World.

See also
List of Billboard number-one Latin songs of 2012

References

2012 singles
Don Omar songs
Universal Music Group singles
Latin Grammy Award for Best Urban Song
Number-one singles in Honduras
Miss Universe
Spanish-language songs
2012 songs
Machete Music singles
Universal Music Latino singles
Songs written by Don Omar